The Partenavia P.64B/P.66B Oscar is an Italian two/four-seat, single-engined, high-wing monoplane built by Partenavia.

Development

Developed as an all-metal version of the P.57 Fachiro, the prototype was designated the P.64 Fachiro III and first flew on 2 April 1965. Improvements were made to the design, mainly to the rear fuselage to fit a panoramic rear window, and now renamed the P.64B Oscar B it first flew in 1967. Also known as the Oscar 180 powered by a 180 hp Lycoming O-360-A1A piston engine, a 200 hp version (with a Lycoming O-360-A1B engine) was known as the Oscar-200. Twenty-one aircraft were delivered to South Africa and assembled by AFIC (Pty) Limited and marketed as the AFIC RSA 200 Falcon.

In January 1976, the company flew a new fully aerobatic version, the P.66C Charlie, and 96 were built, mainly for the Aero Club d'Italia.

Variants
 P.64 Fachiro III - Prototype, one built.
 P.64B Oscar B - Production aircraft with cut-down rear fuselage and  Lycoming engine, 64 built.
 P.64B Oscar 180 - Marketing name for the Oscar B.
 P.64B Oscar 200 - 200 hp version of the Oscar B, 9 built.
 P.66B Oscar 100 - Two-seat version with  Lycoming engine, 80 built.
 P.66B Oscar 150 - Three-seat version with  Lycoming O-320 engine, 50 built.
 P.66C Charlie - Four-seat aerobatic version of the P.66B with 160 hp Lycoming engine, 107 built.
 P.66D Delta - P.66B with minor changes, one built.
 P.66T Charlie - Two-seat trainer version of the P.66C, one built.
 AFIC RSA 200 Falcon - South-African version of the P.64.

Operators

Italian State Police
South Africa

Specifications (P.66C-160 Charlie)

See also

References

Oscar
1960s Italian civil utility aircraft
Aircraft first flown in 1965
Single-engined tractor aircraft
High-wing aircraft